Sardar Mohammad Hashim Khan (1884 – 26 October 1953) was a political figure in Afghanistan.

Life 
He was the younger brother of King Mohammed Nadir Shah and the elder brother of Sardar Shah Mahmud Khan and Sardar Shah Wali Khan. Hashim put into effect the policies already orchestrated by his brothers. Internal objectives of the new Afghan government focused on strengthening the army and shoring up the economy, including transport and communications. Both goals required foreign assistance. Preferring not to rely on the Soviet Union or Britain, Hashim turned to Nazi Germany. By 1935 German experts and businessmen had set up factories and hydroelectric projects at the invitation of the Afghan government. Smaller amounts of aid were also offered by Imperial Japan and Fascist Italy.
He governed Afghanistan as Royal Prime Minister from November 1, 1929 until May 9, 1946.

During the war years he faced significant opposition as a result of his stance on the ongoing political question of whether to yield to the British or resist them. The decision to expel Axis colonies from Afghanistan was particularly unpopular and by October 1941 the Italian Minister in Kabul was reporting to the Foreign Affairs Office in Rome that he would 'have his work cut out to save not only appearances but his life itself'.

References

External links 
Rulers.org

Prime Ministers of Afghanistan
Pashtun people
1884 births
1953 deaths
Afghan anti-communists